Le val d'Andorre (The Valley of Andorra) is an opéra comique by Fromental Halévy with a libretto by Saint-Georges. Although today almost completely forgotten, it was one of Halévy's greatest successes, running for 165 performances and restoring the then precarious financial situation of the Opéra-Comique in Paris where it was given its premiere on 11 November 1848.

Production history
After the premiere, the reviewer of the Parisian Revue et gazette musicale wrote 'This is the most brilliant total success ever recorded at the Opéra-Comique.'

The opera was translated into German and produced in 1849 in Leipzig, where it was praised by Ignaz Moscheles - 'Music of a genuine dramatic character, which has more flow of melody than his other operas. The subject is cleverly worked out and very impressive.'  In 1850 it opened in London, to mediocre reviews, but was graced by a visit from Queen Victoria (for which the French cast had to be hurriedly coached to sing God Save the Queen).

Roles

Synopsis
Place: Andorra
Time:
Stéphan (tenor) seeks to escape conscription by the French army. He is loved by the young Rose de Mai (soprano), Rose's mistress, the widow Thérèse (mezzo-soprano) and the wealthy Georgette (soprano). When he is condemned to death for desertion, Rose ransoms him by stealing money from Thérèse, and claiming that the money is from Georgette. In a typically improbable twist, (stolen from The Marriage of Figaro), Rose turns out to be Thérèse's long-lost daughter, Georgette withdraws, and Rose de Mai and Stéphan are free to marry.

References
Notes

Sources
 Jordan, Ruth (1994). Fromental Halévy, his Life and Music. London: Kahn & Averill. .
 Moscheles, Charlotte (1873). Life of Moscheles:  (2 volumes, translated from German by A. D. Coleridge). London: Hurst and Blackett. .
 Sadie, Stanley, editor (1992). The New Grove Dictionary of Opera (4 volumes). London: Macmillan. .

Operas by Fromental Halévy
1848 operas
Opéras comiques
Operas
French-language operas
Operas set in Andorra